Mário Jorge Costa Carlos (born 21 February 1983), known as Mário Carlos, is a former Portuguese professional football player.

A graduate of Vitória de Setúbal's youth academy, Carlos made his professional debut for the Sadinos on 22 August 2002 against Boavista. Carlos scored his first goal for Vitória de Setúbal on 4 January 2003, in a 2–1 home loss to Sporting CP.

References

External links
 
 
 

1983 births
Living people
Sportspeople from Setúbal
Portuguese footballers
Association football forwards
Primeira Liga players
Vitória F.C. players
FCV Farul Constanța players
C.D. Nacional players
U.D. Leiria players
Liga Portugal 2 players
Liga I players
S.C. Espinho players
Segunda División B players
Zamora CF footballers
Cypriot First Division players
Cypriot Second Division players
Alki Larnaca FC players
Ermis Aradippou FC players
Chalkanoras Idaliou players
Portugal youth international footballers
Portugal under-21 international footballers
Portuguese expatriate footballers
Expatriate footballers in Cyprus
Expatriate footballers in Spain
Expatriate footballers in Romania
Portuguese expatriate sportspeople in Cyprus
Portuguese expatriate sportspeople in Spain
Portuguese expatriate sportspeople in Romania
Association football midfielders